Table tennis competitions at the 2008 Summer Olympics in Beijing were held from August 13 to August 23, at the Peking University Gymnasium. The competition featured the team events for the first time, replacing the doubles events competed in previous games. A total of four sets of medals were awarded for the four events contested. China, as the host country, would win every medal possible, claiming the podium in both the Men's and Women's Singles events and claiming Gold in both the Men's and Women's Team Event, leading the IOC and ITTF, to change the qualification process for the 2012 Summer Olympics, to ensure that countries could only enter 2, instead of 3 athletes into the Singles event.

Qualification

Competition schedule

Participating nations
A total of 171 athletes (86 men and 85 women), representing 56 NOCs, competed in four events.

Medal summary

Medal table

Events

See also 
Table tennis at the 2008 Summer Paralympics

References

External links
 Table Tennis Official Results Book. Official Report of the XXIX Olympiad. Digitally published by the LA84 Foundation.
 
 Table Tennis at the 2008 Summer Olympics. Olympedia.

 
2008 Summer Olympics events
2008
Olympics
Table tennis competitions in China